In geology, plating is a hypothesized process whereby asthenospheric mantle hardens beneath crustal material, thereby becoming attached to it and thereafter moving together with the crustal material as part of the lithosphere.

A complementary process, although it does not necessarily always involve the upper mantle, is called delamination.

See also
 Plate tectonics
 Delamination (geology)
 Ophiolite

References 

Plate tectonics